The Independent Spirit Award for Best Editing is one of the annual awards given out by Film Independent, a non-profit organization dedicated to independent film and independent filmmakers. It was first presented in 2013, with American editor Nat Sanders being the first recipient of the award for his work in Short Term 12.

Winners and nominees

2010s

2020s

See also
 BAFTA Award for Best Editing
 Academy Award for Best Film Editing
 Critics' Choice Movie Award for Best Editing
 American Cinema Editors Award for Best Edited Feature Film – Dramatic
 American Cinema Editors Award for Best Edited Feature Film – Comedy or Musical

References

E
Film editing awards
Awards established in 2013